Igor Sergeev may refer to:

 Igor Sergeyev (1938–2006), Defense Minister of the Russian Federation, 1997–2001
 Igor Sergeyev (Uzbekistani footballer) (born 1993), Uzbek footballer
 Igor Sergeyev (Kyrgyzstani footballer) (born 1969)